Laredo District is one of eleven districts of the Trujillo Province in the La Libertad region, Peru.

Populated places
Some of the populated places in Laredo districts are the following:

Conache
Laredo
Barraza
Menocucho
Quirihuac
Santo Domingo
Bello Horizonte

References

External links
  Official district web site

Districts of the La Libertad Region